Carl Hermann Georg Credner (1 October 1841 – 21 July 1913) was a German earth scientist and the son of Carl Friedrich Heinrich Credner.

Biography
Credner was born at Gotha, educated at Breslau and Göttingen, and took the degree of Ph.D. at Breslau in 1864. From 1864 to 1868, he made extensive geological investigations in North and Central America, the results of which were published in the Zeitschrift der Deutschen Geologischen Gesellschaft, and the Neues Jahrhuch für Mineralogie. In 1870 he was appointed professor of geology in the University of Leipzig, and in 1872 director of the Geological Survey of Saxony.

Works
He is author of numerous publications on the geological formations of Saxony, and published a geological chart of the Kingdom of Saxony (1877 et seq.). He wrote Elemente der Geologie (2 vols., 1872; 7th ed., 1891), regarded as the standard manual in Germany. He also wrote memoirs on Saurians and Labyrinthodonts, for example Die Stegocephalen und Saurier (1881–93).  He also wrote Die Urvierfüssler (Eotetrapoda) des sächsischen Rothliegenden (1891).

Notes

References
 
 
  This source says he was a professor at the University of Göttingen before moving on to Leipzig.

External links
 

1841 births
1913 deaths
People from Gotha (town)
People from Saxe-Coburg and Gotha
German paleontologists
University of Breslau alumni
University of Göttingen alumni
Academic staff of Leipzig University